Norman Hapgood (March 28, 1868 – April 29, 1937) was an American writer, journalist, editor, and critic, and an American Minister to Denmark.

Biography
Norman Hapgood was born March 28, 1868, in Chicago, Illinois to Charles Hutchins Hapgood (1836–1917) and Fanny Louise (Powers) Hapgood (1846–1922). He is the older brother of the journalist and author Hutchins Hapgood. He graduated from Harvard University in 1890 and from the law school there in 1893, then chose to become a writer. Hapgood 
worked as the drama critic of the New York City Commercial Advertiser and of the Bookman in 1897–1902. He was named the editor of Collier's Weekly in 1903 and remained at that post for about a decade, before leaving to become editor of Harper's Weekly in June 1913. His editorial style attracted much attention for its vigor and range.

He inspired T. G. Masaryk to write the first memorandum to president Wilson for independence of Czechoslovakia from London to Washington in January 1917.

During the latter part of World War I and into the early post-war period Hapgood served as president of the League of Free Nations Association, which advocated in favor of a League of Nations to adjudicate international disputes. In this capacity Hapgood helped advance the agenda of President Woodrow Wilson, who sought the establishment of such a body at the Paris Peace Conference of 1919.

In 1919 President Wilson appointed Hapgood Minister to Denmark, in which post he served for about six months. He helped expose Henry Ford's antisemitism in his article, "The Inside Story of Henry Ford's Jew-Mania", Part 4, Hearst's International (September 1922).

In 1922, the International Ladies Garment Workers Union (ILGWU) and the manufacturer's association representing cloak makers chose Norman Hapgood to chair a Wage Commission for workers in the industry (Lorwin, 351 - 352).

Hapgood was married twice. His first wife, Emilie Bigelow Hapgood, whom he married in 1896, went on to become famous in her own right as a theatrical producer in New York. They were divorced in 1915. Two years later, he married his second wife, Elizabeth Kempley Reynolds (1894–1974). Elizabeth Hapgood, who spoke fluent Russian, was the first English-language translator of writings about acting by Konstantin Stanislavsky (it was Norman Hapgood who had first suggested, in 1914, that the Moscow Art Theatre be invited to America).

Norman Hapgood died on April 29, 1937, following prostate surgery at NewYork–Presbyterian Hospital. He was buried in Green-Wood Cemetery, Brooklyn, New York.

Works

 (1897). Literary Statesmen and Others Essays on Men Seen from a Distance [reissued by Books for Libraries Press, 1972] 
 (1899). Abraham Lincoln: The Man of the People.
 (1899). Daniel Webster.
 (1901). George Washington.
 (1901). The Stage in America, 1897–1900. 
 (1911). Industry and Progress. 
 (1919). The Jewish Commonwealth. 
 (1920). The Advancing Hour.
 (1927). Professional Patriots (with Sidney Howard, and John Hearley).
 (1927). Up From the City Streets: A Biographical Study of Alfred E. Smith  (with Henry Moskowitz).
 (1929). Why Janet Should Read Shakspere (sic).
 (1930). The Changing Years.

Louis Lorwin, The Women's Garment Makers (pgs. 351 - 352).

References

External links

 
 The Political Graveyard: Norman Hapgood
 United States Department of State: Ambassadors to Denmark
 Norman Hapgood's grave in Green-Wood Cemetery, Brooklyn, New York
 Norman Hapgood and Elizabeth Reynolds Hapgood Papers Repository: Manuscript Division, Library of Congress, Washington, D.C.
  Photogravure of Hapgood by Doris Ulmann

1868 births
1937 deaths
American magazine editors
20th-century American biographers
American male biographers
Writers from Chicago
Harvard Law School alumni
Ambassadors of the United States to Denmark
Burials at Green-Wood Cemetery
Progressive Era in the United States
Historians from Illinois
Harper's Weekly editors
Harvard College alumni